Kilbey is a surname. Notable people with the surname include:

Cara Kilbey (born 1987), English television personality and sister of Tom Kilbey
Steve Kilbey (born 1954), English-Australian singer-songwriter and bass guitarist
Tom Kilbey (born 1990), English footballer and television personality

See also
Kilby (name)